Janez Drozg (April 4, 1933 – November 10, 2005) was a Slovene television and film director from Celje. Alongside his work with TV Ljubljana which dominated much of his career, he also directed features films such as Boj na požiralniku in 1982 and even made an appearance as an actor in the 1980 film Prestop (Transgression) playing the character of guard leader.

He was a professor at the Academy for Theatre, Radio, Film and Television (AGRFT), a media institution of radio film and television in Slovenia based in the capital Ljubljana.

He died in Ljubljana on November 10, 2005.

References

External links
 

Slovenian television directors
Slovenian film directors
1933 births
2005 deaths
People from Celje
Slovenian male film actors
Academic staff of the University of Ljubljana
20th-century Slovenian male actors
Television people from Ljubljana